Sameodes distictalis is a moth in the family Crambidae. It is found in Indonesia (Pulo Laut).

The wingspan is about 18 mm.

References

Moths described in 1899
Spilomelinae